Trenah is a rural locality in the local government area (LGA) of Dorset in the North-east LGA region of Tasmania. The 2016 census recorded a population of 11 for the state suburb of Trenah.

History 
Trenah was gazetted as a locality in 1976. The name is believed to be an Aboriginal word for “baskets”. 

The locality, on the eastern side of Mount Maurice, was once known as “The Maurice”.

Geography
The boundaries consist primarily of survey lines and ridge lines.

Road infrastructure 
Route C426 (Barnett Road) passes to the north-east. East Maurice Road and Maurice Road provide access to the locality.

References

Towns in Tasmania
Localities of Dorset Council (Australia)